War of the Worlds is a 2005 American science fiction action film directed by Steven Spielberg and written by Josh Friedman and David Koepp, based on H. G. Wells' 1898 novel, The War of the Worlds. It stars Tom Cruise in the main role, Dakota Fanning, Miranda Otto and Tim Robbins, with narration by Morgan Freeman. It follows an American dock worker who must look after his children, from whom he lives separately, as he struggles to protect them and reunite them with their mother when extraterrestrials invade Earth and devastate cities with giant war machines.

The film was shot in 73 days, using five different sound stages as well as locations in California, Connecticut, New Jersey, New York, and Virginia. It was surrounded by a secrecy campaign so few details would be leaked before its release. Tie-in promotions were made with several companies, including Hitachi.

War of the Worlds was released theatrically by Paramount Pictures on June 29, 2005. It received generally positive reviews, with many praising the performances (particularly those of Cruise and Fanning), Spielberg's direction, its screenplay, dark and realistic tone, action sequences, sound design, and visual effects. It was massively successful, grossing over $603 million worldwide, making it the fourth most successful film of 2005. It also earned Academy Awards nominations for Best Visual Effects, Best Sound Mixing and Best Sound Editing.

Plot 
An opening narration explains that Earth was being observed by extraterrestrials with immense intelligence and no compassion: "As man dominated the world, without a doubt, much in the way microorganisms swarm in a drop of water, these beings plotted to take it all from them."

Divorced longshoreman Ray Ferrier works as a crane operator at a dock in Brooklyn, New York, and is estranged from his children: 10-year-old daughter Rachel, and teenage son Robbie. Ray's pregnant former wife, Mary Ann, drops the two off at his house in Bayonne, New Jersey on her way to visit her parents in Boston. Later, a strange storm occurs during which lightning strikes multiple times into the middle of a nearby intersection, causing an EMP that instantly fries almost all electronic devices. Ray reluctantly joins the crowd at the scene of the impacts, where a massive "tripod" war machine emerges from the ground and uses powerful energy weapons to destroy the area, disintegrating most of the witnesses into gray ash.

Ray collects his children, steals the only working van, and drives to Mary Ann's empty home in suburban New Jersey to take refuge. That night, they take shelter in the basement, but they soon hear a strange roaring noise followed by an explosion that destroys the house. By daybreak, they discover the cause of the previous night's strange events: a Boeing 747 had crashed into the neighborhood. Ray meets a wandering TV news team scavenging the wreckage for food wherein a correspondent reveals that tripods have attacked major cities around the world, and that they have force shields that protect them from humanity's defenses; she adds that the tripods' pilots traveled to Earth within the lightning storms to enter their machines, which were apparently buried underground for thousands of years.

Ray decides to drive the kids to Boston to be with their mother, but a desperate mob swarms around their vehicle, forcing them to abandon it. They eventually get to a Hudson River ferry, only to be surrounded by tripods, which either massacre or abduct many of the refugees, but Ray's family manages to escape. They witness US Marines engaging in a battle with some tripods. Much to Ray's dismay, Robbie joins the futile fight against the aliens out of hatred for the invaders, while Ray and Rachel quickly flee. The Marines are obliterated, with Robbie presumed to have been killed with them. Shortly afterward, the pair are offered shelter in a nearby house by a deranged former ambulance driver named Harlan Ogilvy.

The three remain undetected for several hours, even as a high-tech inspection camera and a group of aliens explore the basement. They soon discover that the aliens have started cultivating a red-colored vegetation across the landscape that is quickly spreading. The group deduces that the aliens are terraforming Earth, potentially using the red vegetation as a food source. A few hours later, Harlan suffers a mental breakdown after witnessing the tripods harvesting human blood and tissue to fertilize the alien vegetation. Fearing his mad shouting will alert the aliens, Ray reluctantly kills him. A second tripod camera then catches the Ferriers sleeping, causing Rachel to flee and be abducted by the tripod. To rescue Rachel, Ray intentionally attracts the aliens' attention and is pulled into the tripod. With the other abductees' help, he destroys the tripod from within with grenades.

A few days later, Ray and Rachel arrive in Boston, where they find the alien vegetation withering and the tripods inexplicably collapsing. When an active tripod appears, Ray notices birds landing on it, indicating that its force shields have been disabled. He alerts the soldiers escorting the fleeing crowd, who shoot it down with anti-tank missiles. As the soldiers advance on the downed tripod, a hatch opens and a pale, sickly alien struggles halfway out before collapsing and dying. Ray and Rachel finally reach Mary Ann's parents' house, where they are reunited with Mary Ann and Robbie, who have somehow survived.

In closing, the narrator, echoing Wells' monologue from the original novel, explains that the aliens died because they were vulnerable to the countless microbes that inhabit the Earth, which "God in His wisdom" placed on the planet.

Cast

Tom Cruise as Ray Ferrier
Dakota Fanning as Rachel Ferrier
Miranda Otto as Mary Ann Ferrier
Tim Robbins as Harlan Ogilvy
Justin Chatwin as Robbie Ferrier
Rick Gonzalez as Vincent
Yul Vázquez as Julio
Lenny Venito as Manny the Mechanic
Lisa Ann Walter as Sheryl
Ann Robinson as Grandmother (she played the lead role of Sylvia van Buren in the 1953 film)
Gene Barry as Grandfather (he played lead role of Dr. Clayton Forrester in the 1953 film)
David Alan Basche as Tim
Roz Abrams as Herself
Camillia Sanes as News Producer
Amy Ryan as Neighbor with Toddler
David Harbour as Dock Worker
Danny Hoch as Policeman
Morgan Freeman as the Narrator (voice)
Dee Bradley Baker as Alien Vocals (uncredited)
Columbus Short as Soldier
Channing Tatum as Boy in Church Scene (scene cut)

Production

Development
After collaborating in 2002's Minority Report, Steven Spielberg and Tom Cruise were interested in working together again. Spielberg stated about Cruise, "He's such an intelligent, creative partner, and brings such great ideas to the set that we just spark each other. I love working with Tom Cruise." Cruise met with Spielberg during the filming of Spielberg's Catch Me If You Can (2002) and gave three options of films to create together, one of them being an adaptation of The War of the Worlds. Spielberg chose The War of the Worlds and stated, "We looked at each other and the lights went on. As soon as I heard it, I said 'Oh my God! War of the Worlds – absolutely.'  That was it."

The film is Spielberg's third on the subject of alien visitation, along with Close Encounters of the Third Kind and E.T. the Extra-Terrestrial. Producer and longtime collaborator Kathleen Kennedy notes that with War of the Worlds, Spielberg had the opportunity to explore the antithesis of the characters brought to life in E.T. and Close Encounters of the Third Kind. "When we first started developing E.T., it was a much edgier, darker story and it actually evolved into something that was more benign. I think that the edgier, darker story has always been somewhere inside him. Now, he's telling that story." Spielberg stated that he just thought it would be fun to make a "really scary film with really scary aliens", something which he had never done before. Spielberg was intent on telling a contemporary story, with Kennedy stating the story was created as a fantasy, but depicted in a hyper-realistic way.

J. J. Abrams was asked by Spielberg and Cruise to write the script but had to turn down the film as he was working on the pilot for his television series Lost. Josh Friedman delivered a screenplay, which was then rewritten by David Koepp. After re-reading the novel, Koepp decided to do the script following a single narrator, "a very limited point of view, from someone on the very periphery of events rather than someone involved in events", and created a list of elements he would not use due to being "cliché", such as the destruction of landmark buildings. Some aspects of the book were heavily adapted and condensed: Tim Robbins' character was an amalgam of two characters in the book, with the name borrowed from a third. While changing the setting from 19th century to present day, Koepp also tried to "take the modern world back to the 1800s", with the characters being devoid of electricity and modern techniques of communication.

Spielberg accepted the script after finding it had several similarities to his personal life, including the divorce of his parents (Ray and Mary Ann's divorce), and because the plight of the fictional survivors reflects his own uncertainty after the devastation of the September 11 attacks. For Spielberg, the characters' stories of survival needed to be the main focus, as they featured the American mindset of never giving up. Spielberg described War of the Worlds as "a polar opposite" to Close Encounters, with that movie featuring a man leaving family to travel with aliens, while War of the Worlds focused on keeping the family together. At the same time, the aliens and their motivations would not be much explored, as "we just experience the results of these nefarious plans to replace us with themselves".

Although accepting the script, Spielberg asked for several changes. Spielberg had been against the idea of the aliens arriving in spaceships, since every alien invasion movie used such a vehicle. The original Martian cylinders were discarded, where Spielberg replaced the origins of the tripods with stating they were buried underground in the Earth long ago.

Spielberg had Miranda Otto in mind for the part of Mary Ann, but at the time he called her she was pregnant and thought the opportunity would be missed. Spielberg then decided to incorporate Otto's pregnancy into the film, changing the part for her.

Filming

Filming took place in Virginia, Connecticut, New Jersey, California, and New York. The film shooting lasted an estimated 73 days. Spielberg originally intended to shoot War of the Worlds after Munich, but Tom Cruise liked David Koepp's script so much that he suggested Spielberg postpone the former while he would do the same with Mission: Impossible III. Most of Munichs crew was brought in to work on War of the Worlds as well. In 2004, the production crews quickly were set up on both coasts to prepare for the start date, scouting locations up and down the Eastern Seaboard and preparing stages and sets which would be used when the company returned to Los Angeles after the winter holiday. Pre-production took place in only three months, essentially half the amount of time normally allotted for a film of similar size and scope. Spielberg notes, however, "This wasn't a cram course for War of the Worlds. This was my longest schedule in about 12 years. We took our time." Spielberg collaborated with crews at the beginning of pre-production with the use of previsualization, considering the tight schedule.

The scene depicting the first appearance of the Tripods was filmed at the intersection of Ferry Street, Merchant Street, and Wilson Avenue, in Newark, New Jersey. Later, Spielberg filmed several scenes in Virginia. The continuous scene was filmed in California.

The ferry scene was filmed in the New York town of Athens, and Mary Ann's parents' house was located in Brooklyn (but was featured in the film in Boston). For the neighborhood plane crash scene, the production crew bought a retired Boeing 747 formerly operated by All Nippon Airways as JA8147, with transportation costs of $2 million, dismantled it into several pieces, and built houses around them. The destroyed plane was kept for the Universal Studios back-lot tour. Ray's house was filmed in Bayonne, New Jersey (with a soundstage doubling the interior); meanwhile, the valley war sequence was filmed in Lexington, Virginia and Mystery Mesa in California. The scene where the tripod is shot down and crashes through a factory was filmed in Naugatuck, Connecticut at an abandoned chemical plant. The scene of the bodies floating down the river was filmed on the Farmington River in Windsor, Connecticut by a second unit using a stand in for Dakota Fanning shot from behind with the portion showing the faces of the credited actors cut in later. Some filming was shot on the Korean War Veterans Parkway in Staten Island, New York. The film used six sound stages, spread over three studio lots.

Principal photography began on November 8, 2004 and wrapped on March 7, 2005.

Design and visual effects
Industrial Light & Magic was the main special effects company for the movie. While Spielberg had used computers to help visualize sequences in pre-production before, Spielberg said, "This is the first film I really tackled using the computer to animate all the storyboards." He decided to employ the technique extensively after a visit to his friend George Lucas. In order to keep the realism, the usage of computer-generated imagery shots and bluescreen was limited, with most of the digital effects being blended with miniature and live-action footage.

The design of the Tripods was described by Spielberg as "graceful," with artist Doug Chiang replicating aquatic life forms. At the same time, the director wanted a design that would be iconic while still providing a tribute to the original Tripods, as well as intimidating so the audience would not be more interested about the aliens inside than on the vehicle itself. The visual effects crew tried to blend organic and mechanical elements in the Tripods depiction, and made extensive studies for the movements of the vehicle to be believable, considering the "contradiction" of having a large tank-like head being carried by thin and flexible legs. Animator Randal M. Dutra considered the movements themselves to have a "terrestrial buoyance", in that they were walking on land but had an aquatic flow, and Spielberg described the Tripods as moving like "scary ballet dancers". Most of the alien elements revolved around the number three – the Tripod had three eyes, and both the vehicle and the aliens had three main limbs with three fingers each.

Visual effects supervisor Pablo Helman considered depicting the scale of the Tripod as challenging, considering "Steven wanted to make sure that these creatures were 150 feet tall", as it was the height described by Wells in the novel. The aliens themselves had designs based on jellyfish, with movements inspired by red-eyed tree frogs, and an amphibian quality particularly on the wet skin. A styrofoam alien was used as a stand-in to guide the actors in the basement scene. Spielberg did not want any blood or gore during the Heat-Ray deaths; in the words of Helman, "this was going to be a horror movie for kids". So the effects crew came up with the vaporization of the bodies, and considering it could not be fully digital due to both the complexity of the effect and the schedule, live-action dust was used alongside the CGI ray assimilation and particles. Digital birds followed the Tripods in most scenes to symbolize the presence of death, which Chiang compared to vultures and added that "you don't know if these birds are going to the danger or away from it, if you should follow them or run away."

During the scene where Ray's stolen minivan is attacked by a mob, Janusz Kaminski and Spielberg wanted a lot of interactive lights, so they added different kinds of lights, including Coleman lamps, oil lanterns, flashlights and Maglights. The IL&M crew admitted that the destruction of the Bayonne Bridge was the toughest scene to be made with heavy usage mix of CGI effects and live action elements, and a four-week deadline so the shot could be used in a Super Bowl trailer. The scene originally had only a gas station exploding, but then Spielberg suggested blowing up the bridge as well. The scene involved Tripods shooting a Heat-Ray toward the minivan; the minivan's escape involved a lot of CGI layers to work out. Over 500 CGI effects were used in the film.

Costume designer Joanna Johnston created 60 different versions of Ray's leather jacket, to illustrate the degrees to which he is weathered from the beginning of the journey to the end. "He begins with the jacket, a hoodie, and two t-shirts," explains Johnston. One piece of Dakota Fanning's costume that takes on a special importance is her lavender horse purse: "I wanted her to have something that made her feel safe, some little thing that she could sleep with and put over her face," Johnston notes. "That was the lavender horse purse. We tied it up on a ribbon and Dakota hung it on her body, so it was with her at all times." Johnston dressed Robbie for an unconscious emulation of his father, "They're more alike than they realize, with great tension on the surface," Johnston says.

Music

Longtime Spielberg collaborator John Williams composed the score. It was the first time he had to compose with an incomplete Spielberg film, as only the first six reels, totalling 60 minutes, were ready for him to use as reference. He considered the score "a very serious piece," which had to combine "necessary frightening atmosphere" with "propulsively rhythmic drive for the action scenes"–the music would be symbolically "pulling forward" vehicles in chase scenes, such as Ray driving out of Bayonne, or the Tripod attacking the Hudson ferry. Williams added small nods to classic monster movie scores by having orchestras doing a "grand gesture" in scenes overlooking Tripods. To increase the scariness of the Tripod attacks, Williams added a female chorus with a crescendo resembling a shriek, representing "victims that go out without saying an 'ouch'—they're gone before they can say that". He added a nearly inaudible male choir—which he compared to "Tibetan monks, the lowest known pitch our bodies can make", for the aliens exploring the basement. The only deviation from orchestras were electronic sounds for the opening and closing narrations.

A soundtrack album was released by Decca Records featuring the film's music and Morgan Freeman's opening and closing narrations. The songs "Little Deuce Coupe" and "Hushabye Mountain" are also featured in the movie, the former sung by Tom Cruise, and the latter by Dakota Fanning. An expanded "limited edition" soundtrack was released in 2020 through Intrada Records, with the full film score, a remaster of the 2005 album, and alternate cues as bonus material.

Themes
The film was described as an anti-war film, as civilians run and only try to save themselves and their family instead of fighting back against the alien Tripods. Debra J. Saunders of San Francisco Chronicle described the film as "If aliens invade, don't fight back. Run." Saunders compared the film to Independence Day, where the civilians do run, but they support the military efforts. Many reviewers felt that the film tried to recreate the atmosphere of the September 11 attacks, with bystanders struggling to survive and the usage of missing-persons displays. Spielberg declared to Reader's Digest that beside the work being a fantasy, the threat represented was real: "They are a wake-up call to face our fears as we confront a force intent on destroying our way of life." Screenwriter David Koepp stated that he tried not to put explicit references to September 11 or the Iraq War, but said that the inspiration for the scene where Robbie joins the Marines was teenagers fighting in the Gaza Strip – "I was thinking of teenagers in Gaza throwing bottles and rocks at tanks, and I think that when you're that age you don't fully consider the ramifications of what you're doing and you're very much caught up in the moment and passion, whether that's a good idea or not."  Retained from the novel is the aliens being defeated, not by men's weapons, but the planet's smallest creatures, bacteria, which Koepp described as "nature, in a way, knowing a whole lot more than we do".

Release
War of the Worlds premiered at the Ziegfeld Theatre on June 23, 2005. There, Tom Cruise revealed his relationship with Katie Holmes. Six days later, on June 29, the film was released in approximately 3,908 theaters across America. The home video was released on November 22, 2005.

Secrecy
Spielberg kept most of the parts secret in the filmmaking, as the cast and crew were left confused about how the aliens looked. When asked about the secrecy of the screenplay, David Koepp answered, "[Spielberg] wouldn't give [the screenplay] to anybody". Koepp explained he would e-mail it to him, and he would give a section of the script that was relating to whatever somebody was doing. Miranda Otto thought of not even discussing the story with her family and friends. Otto said, "I know some people who always say, 'Oh, everything's so secret.' I think it's good. In the old days people didn't get to know much about movies before they came out and nowadays there's just so much information. I think a bit of mystery is always really good. You don't want to blow all of your cards beforehand."

Spielberg admitted after keeping things secret for so long, there is in the end the temptation to reveal too much to the detriment of the story at the press conference of War of the Worlds. So, Spielberg only revealed the hill scene, where Ray tries to stop his son from leaving, stating "to say more would reveal too much." The actual budget of the film was $132 million.

According to Vanity Fair, Spielberg's relations with Cruise were "poor" during the film's release because Spielberg believed Cruise's "antics" at the time (such as an erratic appearance on the Oprah Winfrey show) had "hurt" the film and after a doctor whose name Spielberg had given to Cruise was picketed by Scientologists.

Marketing and home media releases
Paramount Pictures Interactive Marketing debuted a human survival online game on its official website , on April 14 to promote the film. Hitachi collaborated with Paramount Pictures for a worldwide promotional campaign, under the title of "The Ultimate Visual Experience". The agreement was announced by Kazuhiro Tachibana, general manager of Hitachi's Consumer Business Group. Kazuhiro stated, "Our 'The Ultimate Visual Experience' campaign is a perfect match between Spielberg and Cruise's pursuit of the world's best in film entertainment and Hitachi's commitment to the highest picture quality through its digital consumer electronic products."

The film was released on VHS and DVD on November 22, 2005, with both a single-disc edition and a two-disc special edition which included production featurettes, documentaries and various trailers. The film grossed $113,000,000 in DVD sales, bringing its total film gross to $704,745,540, ranking tenth place in the 2005 DVD sales chart. Paramount released the film on Blu-ray Disc on June 1, 2010.

Reception

Box office
On , the film grossed approximately US$81 million worldwide, and earned the 38th-biggest opening week by grossing $98,826,764 in 3,908 theatres, an average of $25,288 at each theater. On Independence Day weekend, it grossed $64,878,725 in 3,908 theatres, an average of $16,601, and gave Tom Cruise his biggest opening weekend until the release of Top Gun: Maverick in May 2022. It was the second-biggest film opening on Independence Day weekend, after Spider-Man 2. During its first five days of release, it made $100.2 million, breaking The Lost World: Jurassic Parks record to become the fastest Steven Spielberg film to reach $100 million. It earned $200 million in 24 days, ranking 37th in the list of fastest films to gross $200 million. It has grossed $704,745,540 including DVD sales, making it the fourth highest-grossing film of 2005 and the 66th highest-grossing film worldwide.

Critical reaction
On Rotten Tomatoes, War of the Worlds holds a 75% approval rating based on 264 reviews and an average rating of 7/10. The critical consensus states: "Steven Spielberg's adaptation of War of the Worlds delivers on the thrill and paranoia of H.G. Wells' classic novel while impressively updating the action and effects for modern audiences." Review aggregator website Metacritic gave the film an average score of 73 out of 100 based on 40 reviews, indicating "generally favorable reviews". Audiences polled by CinemaScore gave the film an average grade of "B+" on an A+ to F scale.

James Berardinelli praised the acting and considered that focusing the narrative on the struggle of one character made the film more effective, but described the ending as weak, even though Spielberg "does the best he can to make it cinematically dramatic". Total Film'''s review gave War of the Worlds four out of five stars, considering that "Spielberg finds fresh juice in a tale already adapted for film, TV, stage, radio and record", and describing the film as having many "startling images", comparing the first Tripod attack to the Omaha Beach landing from Saving Private Ryan.Los Angeles Times Kenneth Turan, who commended the film's special effects, stated that Spielberg may actually have done his job in War of the Worlds "better than he realizes". Turan claimed that, by "showing us how fragile our world is", Spielberg raises a provocative question: "Is the ultimate fantasy an invasion from outer space, or is it the survival of the human race?" However, Broomfield Enterprises Dan Marcucci and Nancy Serougi did not share Berardinelli and Turan's opinion. They felt that Morgan Freeman's narration was unnecessary, and that the first half was "great" but the second half "became filled with clichés, riddled with holes, and tainted by Tim Robbins".

Michael Wilmington of the Chicago Tribune gave the film three-and-a-half stars out of four, writing "War of the Worlds definitely wins its battle, but not the war." Wilmington stated that the film "takes [viewers] on a wild journey through two sides of [Spielberg]: the dark and the light." He also said the film contained a core sentiment similar to that of Spielberg's E.T. the Extra-Terrestrial. About.com's Rebecca Murray gave a positive review, stating, "Spielberg almost succeeds in creating the perfect alien movie", with criticism only for the ending. 

Jonathan Rosenbaum of Chicago Reader praised the special effects and Cruise's performance. Roger Ebert criticized the "retro design" and considered that despite the big budget, the alien invasion was "rudimentary" and "not very interesting", regarding the best scenes as Ray walking among the airliner wreckage and a train running in flames, declaring that "such scenes seem to come from a kind of reality different from that of the tripods."

The French film magazine Cahiers du cinéma ranked the film as 8th place in its list of best films of the 2000s. Japanese film director Kiyoshi Kurosawa listed the film as the best film of 2000–2009.

Lawrence Brown wrote: "Spielberg's decision to present the invaders' fighting machines as having been there all along, buried deep under the Earth, raises questions which did not exist in the original Wells book. In Spielberg's version, these invaders had been here before, long ago, in prehistoric times. They had set up their machines deep underground, and departed. Why? Why not take over the Earth right there and then? Spielberg does not provide an answer, and the characters are too busy surviving to wonder about this. An answer suggests itself – a very chilling answer. The invaders were interested in humans as food animals. When they came here before, humans were very scarce. The aliens left their hidden machines and departed, patiently observing the Earth until humans would multiply to the requisite numbers – and then they came back, to take over. Under this interpretation, all of us – all humans over the whole of history – have been livestock living in an alien food farm, destined to be 'harvested'".

AccoladesWar of the Worlds was nominated for three Academy Awards: Sound Editing, Sound Mixing (Andy Nelson, Anna Behlmer and Ron Judkins) and Visual Effects (Pablo Helman); it lost them all to King Kong''. It was nominated for six Saturn Awards, and won Best Performance by a Younger Actor (Dakota Fanning). It won a Golden Reel Award for Sound Effects & Foley, a World Soundtrack Award for Best Original Soundtrack, and three VES Awards for its special effects,  and was nominated for three Empire Awards, three Satellite Awards, and an MTV Movie Award. It was also nominated for a Golden Raspberry Award for Worst Actor for Tom Cruise.

See also
 The War of the Worlds: A 1953 film adaptation of the source material.

Notes

References

External links

 
 

2005 films
2005 science fiction action films
2000s American films
Alien invasions in films
Amblin Entertainment films
American science fiction action films
American science fiction thriller films
American action thriller films
American thriller films
American robot films
Apocalyptic films
Techno-thriller films
Cruise/Wagner Productions films
DreamWorks Pictures films
Films based on The War of the Worlds
Films directed by Steven Spielberg
Films produced by Kathleen Kennedy
Films scored by John Williams
Films set in Boston
Films set in New Jersey
Films set in New York (state)
Films set in New York City
Films shot in California
Films shot in Connecticut
Films shot in New Jersey
Films shot in New York (state)
Films shot in Newark, New Jersey
Films shot in New York City
Films shot in Virginia
Paramount Pictures films
Films with screenplays by David Koepp
Films about the United States Marine Corps
Films about the United States Army
Films about extraterrestrial life
2000s English-language films